The Congress of the Philippines is the legislature of the national government of the Philippines. It is bicameral, composed of a lower body, the House of Representatives, although colloquially the term "Congress" commonly refers to just the latter, and an upper body, the Senate. The House of Representatives meets in the Batasang Pambansa in Quezon City while the Senate meets in the GSIS Building in Pasay. 

The Senate is composed of 24 senators half of which are elected every three years. Each senator, therefore, serves a total of six years. The senators are elected at-large and do not represent any geographical district.

In the current 19th Congress, there are 316 seats in the House of Representatives. The Constitution states that the House "shall be composed of not more than 250 members, unless otherwise fixed by law," and that at least 20% of it shall be sectoral representatives. There are two types of congressmen: the district and party-list representatives. At the time of the ratification of the constitution, there were 200 districts, leaving 50 seats for party-list representatives.

The district congressmen represent a particular congressional district of the country. All provinces in the country are composed of at least one congressional district. Several cities also have their own congressional districts, with some having two or more representatives. From 200 districts in 1987, the number of districts have increased to 243. Every new Congress has seen an increase in the number of districts.

The party-list congressmen represent the minority sectors of the population. This enables these minority groups to be represented in the Congress, when they would otherwise not be represented properly through district representation. Party-list representatives represent labor unions, rights groups, and other organizations. With the increase of districts also means that the seats for party-list representatives increase as well, as the 1:4 ratio has to be respected.

The Constitution provides that Congress shall convene for its regular session every year beginning on the 4th Monday of July. A regular session can last until thirty days before the opening of its next regular session in the succeeding year. The president may, however, call special sessions which are usually held between regular legislative sessions to handle emergencies or urgent matters.

History

Spanish era

During the Spanish colonization of the Philippines, municipal governments, or Cabildos were established. One such example was the Cabildo in Manila, established in 1571.

When the Philippines was under colonial rule as part of the Spanish East Indies, the colony was not given representation to the Spanish Cortes. It was only in 1809 where the colony was made an integral part of Spain and was given representation in the Cortes. While colonies such as the Philippines were selecting its delegates, substitutes were named so that the Cortes can convene. The substitutes, and first delegates for the Philippines were Pedro Pérez de Tagle and José Manuel Couto. Both had no connections to the colony.

By July 1810, Governor General Manuel González de Aguilar received the instruction to hold an election. As only the Manila Municipal Council qualified to elect a representative, it was tasked to select a delegate. Three of its representatives, the governor-general and the Archbishop of Manila selected Ventura de los Reyes as Manila's delegate to the Cortes. De los Reyes arrived in Cadiz in December 1811.

However, with Napoleon I's defeat at the Battle of Waterloo, his brother Joseph Bonaparte was removed from the Spanish throne, and the Cádiz Constitution was replaced by the Cortes on May 24, 1816, with a more conservative constitution that removed Philippine representation on the Cortes, among other things. Restoration of Philippine representation to the Cortes was one of the grievances by the Ilustrados, the educated class during the late 19th century.

Revolutionary era

The Illustrados' campaign transformed into the Philippine Revolution that aimed to overthrow Spanish rule. Proclaiming independence on June 12, 1898, President Emilio Aguinaldo then ordered the convening of a revolutionary congress at Malolos. The Malolos Congress, among other things, approved the Malolos Constitution. With the approval of the Treaty of Paris, the Spanish ceded the Philippines to the United States. The revolutionaries, attempting to prevent American conquest, launched the Philippine–American War, but were defeated when Aguinaldo was captured in 1901.

American era

When the Philippines was under American colonial rule, the legislative body was the Philippine Commission which existed from 1900 to 1907. The President of the United States appointed the members of the Philippine Commission. Furthermore, two Filipinos served as Resident Commissioners to the House of Representatives of the United States from 1907 to 1935, then only one from 1935 to 1946. The Resident Commissioners had a voice in the House, but did not have voting rights.

The Philippine Bill of 1902 mandated the creation of a bicameral or a two-chamber Philippine Legislature with the Philippine Commission as the Upper House and the Philippine Assembly as the Lower House. This bicameral legislature was inaugurated in 1907. Through the leadership of then Speaker Sergio Osmeña and then-Floor Leader Manuel L. Quezon, the Rules of the 59th United States Congress were substantially adopted as the Rules of the Philippine Legislature.

In 1916, the Jones Law changed the legislative system. The Philippine Commission was abolished, and a new bicameral Philippine Legislature consisting of a House of Representatives and a Senate was established.

Commonwealth and Second Republic era

The legislative system was changed again in 1935. The 1935 Constitution, aside from instituting the Commonwealth which gave the Filipinos more role in government, established a unicameral National Assembly. But in 1940, through an amendment to the 1935 Constitution, a bicameral Congress of the Philippines consisting of a House of Representatives and a Senate was created. Those elected in 1941 would not serve until 1945, as World War II erupted. The invading Japanese set up the Second Philippine Republic and convened its own National Assembly. With the Japanese defeat in 1945, the Commonwealth and its Congress was restored. The same setup continued until the Americans granted independence on July 4, 1946.

Independent era 

Upon the inauguration of the Republic of the Philippines on July 4, 1946, Republic Act No. 6 was enacted providing that on the date of the proclamation of the Republic of the Philippines, the existing Congress would be known as the First Congress of the Republic. Successive Congresses were elected until President Ferdinand Marcos declared martial law on September 23, 1972. Marcos then ruled by decree.

As early as 1970, Marcos had convened a constitutional convention to revise the 1935 constitution; in 1973, the Constitution was approved. It abolished the bicameral Congress and created a unicameral National Assembly, which would ultimately be known as the Batasang Pambansa in a semi-presidential system of government. The batasan elected a prime minister. The Batasang Pambansa first convened in 1978.

Marcos was overthrown after the 1986 People Power Revolution; President Corazon Aquino then ruled by decree. Later that year she appointed a constitutional commission that drafted a new constitution. The Constitution was approved in a plebiscite the next year; it restored the presidential system of government together with a bicameral Congress of the Philippines. It first convened in 1987.

Seat 

The two houses of Congress meet at different places in Metro Manila, the seat of government: the Senate meets at the GSIS Building, the main office of the Government Service Insurance System (GSIS) at Pasay, while the House of Representatives sits at the Batasang Pambansa Complex in Quezon City.

The Barasoain Church in Malolos, Bulacan served as a meeting place of unicameral congress of the First Philippine Republic.

After the Americans defeated the First Republic, the US-instituted Philippine Legislature convened at the Ayuntamiento in Intramuros, Manila from 1907 until 1926, when it transferred to the Legislative Building just outside Intramuros. In the Legislative Building, the Senate occupied the upper floors while the House of Representatives used the lower floors.

With the Legislative Building destroyed during the Battle of Manila of 1945, the Commonwealth Congress convened at the Old Japanese Schoolhouse at Sampaloc. Congress met at the school auditorium, with the Senate convening on evenings and the House of Representatives meeting every morning. The Senate subsequently moved to the Manila City Hall, with the House staying in the schoolhouse. The two chambers of Congress returned to the reconstructed Legislative Building, now the Congress Building in 1950. In 1973, when President Marcos ruled by decree, Congress was padlocked. Marcos built a new seat of a unicameral parliament at Quezon City, which would eventually be the Batasang Pambansa Complex. The parliament that will eventually be named as the Batasang Pambansa (National Legislature), first met at the Batasang Pambansa Complex in 1978.

With the overthrow of Marcos after the People Power Revolution, the bicameral Congress was restored. The House of Representatives inherited the Batasang Pambansa Complex, while the Senate returned to the Congress Building. In May 1997, the Senate moved to the newly constructed building owned by the GSIS on land reclaimed from Manila Bay at Pasay; the Congress Building was eventually transformed into the National Museum of Fine Arts. The Senate will eventually move into a new building that they would own in Fort Bonifacio, Taguig.

Powers

The powers of the Congress of the Philippines may be classified as:

General Legislative
It consists of the enactment of laws intended as a rule of conduct to govern the relation between individuals (i.e., civil laws, commercial laws, etc.) or between individuals and the state (i.e., criminal law, political law, etc.)
Implied Powers
It is essential to the effective exercise of other powers expressly granted to the assembly.
Inherent Powers
These are the powers which although not expressly given are nevertheless exercised by the Congress as they are necessary for its existence such as:
to determine the rules of proceedings;
to compel attendance of absent members to obtain quorum to do business;
to keep journal of its proceedings; etc.
Specific Legislative
It has reference to powers which the Constitution expressly and specifically directs to perform or execute.
Powers enjoyed by the Congress classifiable under this category are: 
Power to appropriate;
Power to act as constituent assembly; (for drafting an amendment to the constitution upon a vote of three-fourths of all its members)
Power to impeach; (to initiate all cases of impeachment is the power of the House of Representatives; To try all cases of impeachment is the power of the Senate.)
Power to confirm treaties;(Only the Senate is authorized to use this power.)
Power to declare the existence of war; (The Senate and the House of Representatives must convene in joint session to do this.)
Power to concur amnesty; and
Power to act as board of canvasser for presidential/vice-presidential votes. (by creating a joint congressional committee to do the canvassing.)
Power to contempt
Blending of power
Delegation of power
Budgetary power
Power to taxation
Executive
Powers of the Congress that are executive in nature are:
Appointment of its officers;
Affirming treaties;
Confirming presidential appointees through the Commission on Appointments;
Removal power; etc.
Supervisory
The Congress of the Philippines exercises considerable control and supervision over the administrative branch - e.g.:
To decide the creation of a department/agency/office;
To define powers and duties of officers;
To appropriate funds for governmental operations;
To prescribe rules and procedure to be followed; etc.
Electoral
Considered as electoral power of the Congress of the Philippines are the Congress' power to:
Elect its presiding officer/s and other officers of the House;
Act as board of canvassers for the canvass of presidential/vice-presidential votes; and
Elect the President in case of any electoral tie to the said post.
Judicial
Constitutionally, each house has judicial powers:
To punish its Members for disorderly behavior, and, with the concurrence of two-thirds of all its Members, suspend or expel a Member
To concur and approve amnesty declared by the President of the Philippines;
To initiate, prosecute and thereafter decide cases of impeachment; and
To decide electoral protests of its members through the respective Electoral Tribunal.
Miscellaneous
The other powers of Congress mandated by the Constitution are as follows:
To authorize the Commission on Audit to audit fund and property;
To authorize the President of the Philippines to fix tariff rates, quotas, and dues;
To authorize the President of the Philippines to formulate rules and regulations in times of emergency;
To reapportion legislative districts based on established constitutional standards;
To implement laws on autonomy;
To establish a national language commission;
To implement free public secondary education;
To allow small scale utilization of natural resources;
To specify the limits of forest lands and national parks;
To determine the ownership and extent of ancestral domain; and
To establish independent economic and planning agency.

Lawmaking

 Preparation of the bill
The Member or the Bill Drafting Division of the Reference and Research Bureau prepares and drafts the bill upon the Member's request.
First reading
The bill is filed with the Bills and Index Service and the same is numbered and reproduced.
Three days after its filing, the same is included in the Order of Business for First Reading.
On First Reading, the Secretary General reads the title and number of the bill. The Speaker refers the bill to the appropriate Committee/s.
Committee consideration / action
The Committee where the bill was referred to evaluates it to determine the necessity of conducting public hearings.
If the Committee finds it necessary to conduct public hearings, it schedules the time thereof, issues public notices and invites resource persons from the public and private sectors, the academe, and experts on the proposed legislation.
If the Committee determines that public hearing is not needed, it schedules the bill for Committee discussion/s.
Based on the result of the public hearings or Committee discussions, the Committee may introduce amendments, consolidate bills on the same subject matter, or propose a substitute bill. It then prepares the corresponding committee report.
The Committee approves the Committee Report and formally transmits the same to the Plenary Affairs Bureau.
Second reading
The Committee Report is registered and numbered by the Bills and Index Service. It is included in the Order of Business and referred to the Committee on Rules.
The Committee on Rules schedules the bill for consideration on Second Reading.
On Second Reading, the Secretary General reads the number, title and text of the bill and the following takes place:
Period of Sponsorship and Debate
Period of Amendments
Voting, which may be by
viva voce
count by tellers
division of the House
nominal voting
Third reading
The amendments, if any, are engrossed and printed copies of the bill are reproduced for Third Reading.
The engrossed bill is included in the Calendar of Bills for Third Reading and copies of the same are distributed to all the Members three days before its Third Reading.
On Third Reading, the Secretary General reads only the number and title of the bill.
A roll call or nominal voting is called and a Member, if he desires, is given three minutes to explain his vote. No amendment on the bill is allowed at this stage.
The bill is approved by an affirmative vote of a majority of the Members present.
If the bill is disapproved, the same is transmitted to the Archives.
Transmittal of the approved bill to the Senate
The approved bill is transmitted to the Senate for its concurrence.
Senate action on approved bill of the House
The bill undergoes the same legislative process in the Senate.
Conference committee
A Conference Committee is constituted and is composed of Members from each House of Congress to settle, reconcile or thresh out differences or disagreements on any provision of the bill.
The conferees are not limited to reconciling the differences in the bill but may introduce new provisions germane to the subject matter or may report out an entirely new bill on the subject.
The Conference Committee prepares a report to be signed by all the conferees and the chairman.
The Conference Committee Report is submitted for consideration/approval of both Houses. No amendment is allowed.
Transmittal of the bill to the President
Copies of the bill, signed by the Senate President and the Speaker of the House of Representatives and certified by both the Secretary of the Senate and the Secretary General of the House, are transmitted to the President.
Presidential action on the bill
If the bill is approved by the President, it is assigned an RA number and transmitted to the House where it originated.
Action on approved bill
The bill is reproduced and copies are sent to the Official Gazette Office for publication and distribution to the implementing agencies. It is then included in the annual compilation of Acts and Resolutions.
Action on vetoed bill
The message is included in the Order of Business. If the Congress decides to override the veto, the House and the Senate shall proceed separately to reconsider the bill or the vetoed items of the bill. If the bill or its vetoed items is passed by a vote of two-thirds of the Members of each House, such bill or items shall become a law.

Composition 
In the diagrams below, Congress is divided in blocs, with the colors referring to the political party of the person leading that bloc. The blocs are determined by the vote of the member in speakership or Senate presidential elections.

The Senate is composed of the winners of the 2016 and 2019 Senate elections. The House of Representatives is composed of the winners of the 2019 House of Representatives elections. In both chambers, the majority bloc is composed of members generally supportive of the presidency of Rodrigo Duterte, while the minority blocs are those opposed. In the House of Representatives, there is an independent minority bloc, and 4 vacant seats.

In both chambers, membership in committees is determined by the size of the bloc; only members of the majority and minority blocs are given committee memberships. In the Philippines, political parties are liquid, and it is not uncommon to see partymates see themselves on different blocs.

Leadership 
Each chamber is headed by a presiding officer, both elected from their respective membership; in the Senate, it is the Senate President, while in the House of Representatives, it is the Speaker. The Senate also has a Senate president pro tempore, and the House of Representatives has deputy speakers. Each chamber has its own floor leaders.

Voting requirements 
The vote requirements in the Congress of the Philippines are as follows:

In most cases, such as the approval of bills, only a majority of members present is needed; on some cases such as the election of presiding officers, a majority of all members, including vacant seats, is needed.

Sessions 

A new session of Congress starts after every House of Representatives election. During the operation of the 1935 constitution as amended in 1940, mid-term elections in the Senate cause its membership to be changed mid-session. From 1945 to 1972, there were two commonwealth congresses and seven congresses of the republic, with the 2nd Commonwealth Congress becoming the 1st Congress of the Republic. During the usage of the 1973 constitution, the Batasang Pambansa was the legislature, with it having two elections. Starting in the 1987 constitution, each Senate election was synchronized with the House elections, with the first congress under that constitution being counted as the "8th Congress", picking up from the last congress of the 1935 constitution.

Per historical era

List of Congresses

Latest elections

Senate

In the Philippines, the most common way to illustrate the result in a Senate election is via a tally of candidates in descending order of votes. The twelve candidates with the highest number of votes are elected.

House of Representatives

A voter has two votes in the House of Representatives: one vote for a representative elected in the voter's congressional district (first-past-the-post), and one vote for a party in the party-list system (closed list), the so-called party-list representatives; party-list representatives shall comprise not more than 20% of the House of Representatives.

To determine the winning parties in the party-list election, a party must surpass the 2% election threshold of the national vote; usually, the party with the largest number of votes wins the maximum three seats, the rest two seats. If the number of seats of the parties that surpassed the 2% threshold is less than 20% of the total seats, the parties that won less than 2% of the vote gets one seat each until the 20% requirement is met.

District elections

Party-list election

See also 
 Politics of the Philippines
 Senate of the Philippines
 House of Representatives of the Philippines
 Legislative districts of the Philippines
 List of Philippine Senate committees
 List of Philippine House committees
 List of legislatures by country
 List of current members of the Congress of the Philippines by wealth

Notes

References

Sources 
 Ramirez, Efren V. and Lee, Jr., German G., The New Philippine Constitution. Cebu City: 1987: pp. 142–173.
 Article VI of the 1987 Philippine Constitution
 How a Bill becomes a Law
 Legislative History
 Your Legislature

External links 
 Official Website of the Senate
 Official Website of the House of Representatives

 
Politics of the Philippines
Political organizations based in the Philippines
Philippines
Government of the Philippines
Philippines
Former territorial legislatures of the United States